Ama (Sawiyanu) is a Left May language of Papua New Guinea, in East Sepik Province. Former dialects have merged.

Ethnologue reports that it is spoken in Ama (Wopolu I), Kauvia (Kawiya), Waniap creek, Wopolu II (Nokonufa), and Yonuwai villages of Tunap/Hunstein Rural LLG, East Sepik Province.

Phonology
Ama has 12 consonants, which are:
{| 
| p || t ||  || k || kʷ || 
|-
| ɸ || s ||  ||  ||  || h
|-
| m || n ||  ||  ||  || 
|-
|w
| ɻ  ||j
| ||  || 
|}

Ama has 7 vowels, which are:
{| 
| i || u
|-
| e || o
|-
|  || ɔ
|-
| a || ɒ
|}

Pronouns
Pronouns are:

{| 
!  !! sg !! du !! pl
|-
! 1incl
| moti || moi
|-
! 1excl
| yo/ya || koti || koi
|-
! 2
| nono/na || moti || moi
|-
! 3
| to/ta || toti || toi
|}

Grammar
Ama has four tenses, which are marked by suffixes.
remote past (-ki)
near past (i. e. yesterday) (-a)
present (today) (Ø, unmarked)
future (-imoi ~ -i)

References

Left May languages
Languages of East Sepik Province